Toewang Gewog (Dzongkha: སྟོད་ཝང་) is a gewog (village block) of Punakha District, Bhutan.

References

Gewogs of Bhutan
Punakha District